Fighting Fear is a 2011 Australian documentary film about professional surfing. In 2013, the film was honored by the Australian Film Institute with two Australian Academy of Cinema and Television Arts Awards, specifically for Best Cinematography in a Documentary and Best Direction in a Documentary. The film stars Richie Vaculik and Mark Matthews. It was filmed in and around Sydney, Australia, primarily in the South-Eastern Sydney suburbs.

References

External links
 
 
 
 

Films set in Australia
Films shot in Australia
Australian surfing films
2011 films
Documentary films about surfing
2010s English-language films
Australian sports documentary films